¥eah ¥eah ¥eah No is the third official EP by  multi-instrumentalist and Dutch singer Jett Rebel. The EP was released on January 18, 2019 without any announcement. The first and only single of this EP was launched on June 7, 2019, Waiting For The Weekend. This coincided with Rebel's first encounter in England. On June 11, 2019, Rebel put on his first show in Notting Hill Arts Club in London.

Single
In an interview with the Ventsmagazine, Rebel explains what Waiting For The Weekend is about: "The song is about the drag of everyday life, the boring life. I feel so many of us are waiting for the “weekend”. Personally I don’t really have this separation between weekdays and weekend anymore, because I work all the time. If I happen to have a real day off, it’s usually rather a Monday or Tuesday. “The Weekend” so the weekend is whenever we are free to be who we wanna be, and to do what we wanna do."

Recording
¥eah ¥eah ¥eah No was recorded live at the Wisseloord Studios. For the second time Rebel went into the studio with the power trio Jett Rebel 3, this time with drummer Willem van der Krabben and bassist Xander Vrienten. This is also the 2nd time Rebel chooses not to do everything on his own, just like in 2016 when recording the album Don't Die On Me Now. "Everything you hear on the record sounds exactly as it should be, Rebel says to music news from the UK".
For this EP there are 3 extra tracks played live but in the end they didn't make it to the EP. Tracks: Lady On The Hill, Bleed Me An Ocean and Slowdancer. These tracks are regularly played live during performances at festivals or a tour. Something he does more often during his live shows, performing unreleased work.

Track listening
All songs written by Jett Rebel
 
 "Waiting For The Weekend" - 1:58
 "Take Me" - 3:23
 "Dancing Through The Room" - 3:34
 "Do You Want Me" - 3:29
 "I See You" - 4:25

Personnel
The EP is written, composed, arranged and produced by Jett Rebel. Audio engineering by Felix Tournier. Mixing by Peter Kriek. Darcy Proper did the mastering in the Wisseloord Studios.

Recorded live:
 Jett Rebel - Lead vocals, guitar
 Xander Vrienten - Bass guitar
 Willem van der Krabben - drums

The EP ¥eah ¥eah ¥eah No is only available digitally. 

The artwork concept is by Jett Rebel, the picture on the cover was photographed by Jens van der Velde: "Jett Rebel artistically challenged me to ask more gray than black in this picture for his latest EP ¥eah ¥eah ¥eah No. Fortunately, the picture was taken in daylight. One take, not a post-production, just like he recorded his tracks".

¥eah ¥eah ¥eah No has been released on record label Baby Tiger Records, his own label.

Reception
The English media has paid particular attention to the ¥eah ¥eah ¥eah No EP. The reviews were positive. RT Lee in review for Subba-Cultcha: With ‘Waiting for the Weekend’ Jett Rebel is serving up a perfect slice of 50s rock ‘n’ roll infused punk-pop. It’s big, it's sexy and it's glamorous. A guaranteed, solid-gold earworm of a single, ‘Waiting for the Weekend’ shouts open road, top down, summer-time fun – play & repeat. Jett Rebel lives, eats and breathes music, having played 250 festivals and 7 sold-out club tours so far.

References

Jett Rebel albums
2019 EPs